Gheorghe Ilie (born 14 June 1927) was a Romanian boxer. He competed in the men's featherweight event at the 1952 Summer Olympics.

References

External links
 

1927 births
Possibly living people
Romanian male boxers
Olympic boxers of Romania
Boxers at the 1952 Summer Olympics
Place of birth missing
Featherweight boxers